Sébastienne Marie Henriette Guyot (26 April 1896 – 21 August 1941) was a French engineer who specialized in aerodynamic flying. She was born in Pont l'Abbé in the Finistère.

A teacher, Guyot resigned in 1917 to prepare for the competition of the Ecole Centrale of the Paris Lycée Jules-Ferry when she learned that the school would accept girls into its ranks. She graduated in 1921 from the first class of Central School of Paris to accept women. She ranked 45th of 243 graduates (425 students were received in the contest).

Also a top athlete, she participated in the 1928 Summer Olympics in Amsterdam in the 800 meters.  She was also French Cross Country Champion in 1928.

Arrested by the Germans in 1940, she died in 1941 in Paris as a result of her imprisonment.

Early life 
Sébastienne Marie Henriette Guyot was born 26 April 1896 at Pont-‘l’Abbé in Brittany. Her father worked as a mounted policeman, ultimately being promoted to the role of Adjutant-Chef. She had one elder brother George (1894-1982) who became a pilot in the First World War and decorated with the Légion d’Honneur in 1917. Her two younger brothers were Roger (1901- 1980) and René (1903–1977).

Education 

In the spring of 1917, Sébastienne Guyot was working as a teacher. Turning twenty-one meant she was now legally an adult and able to make her own decisions, financial or otherwise. She gave up teaching and in October 1917 enrolled at the Lycée Jules Ferry in Paris, which ran classes to help women to prepare for the 1918 competition for entry into Central School of Paris, which had just permitted women to join their classes (as long as they sat in the front row). She came fifty-seventh out of 425 successful candidates passing the examination to enter the Central School of Paris. She chose to study mechanics, which included electrical engineering. By the end of the first year only 262 engineering students remained, with only 243 actually graduating in 1921.

Career in engineering 
After graduation, Guyot moved into working in aviation. She may have been inspired by her older brother George’s experiences during the First World War, when he fought first as an aviation observer, got shot down and later trained and flew as a pilot, earning the Légion d’Honneur.

Guyot initially worked in two small companies, the “Ateliers de construction de l'Ouest" and then at the "Établissements Lumière" company from c.1922 through to 1928. The Lumiere aeroplane company was set up by Louis de Monge, a Belgian engineer living in Paris, to design aircraft. Guyot worked on the company's small twin-engine aircraft, launched in 1924, although much of the company's work was to undertake aeronautical research projects for the French government.

In 1929 Guyot moved to work as an aeronautical engineer at the "Hydravions Lioré & Olivier", a much larger company, which designed and manufactured seaplanes and military aircraft, including the LeO 45. She remained there until 1935, working on fuselages and hulls of several seaplanes, and in collaboration with designers, Paul Asantchéef and André Violleau, who thought highly of her.

In 1932, Guyot learnt to fly and bought a second-hand light plane, a Farman 231 with lowered wings, two-seater tandem roadster, Renault 95 horsepower engine, maximum speed around 186 km / h12. It was registered number F-AJZN and had a decal of two dogs on its side.

Around 1932 Guyot started working on the engineering of rotary blades for rotor craft. A 1933 record of a helicopter named "Loth-Guyot" survives in the Air Section of the Historical Defence Service at Vincennes. Between 1932 and 1939, Guyot took out six patents in conjunction with engineer and entrepreneur William Arthur Loth (1888-1957), concerned with improving the lift of the rotator blades. One involved the stabilisation of rotating lifting systems, another a swivelling screw propeller.

In 1936, the Arsenal de l'Aéronautique (usually called the Arsenal), a national military aircraft manufacturer, was established by the French Government at Villacoublay. In the dossier compiled by her brothers in 1947, making the case for her Resistance Medal, Sébastienne Guyot was described as "Head of the Helicopter Service at the Arsenal de l'Aéronautique", although details of her role there remain sketchy. The Arsenal was moved to Toulouse during the Second World War. It was dissolved in the 1950s and its pre-war records have disappeared.

Sport 
As well as her engineering and aeronautical career, Sébastienne Guyot was also a successful long-distance runner. In January 1927 she joined the Académie at the Val d´Or stadium, one of the few sports clubs which promoted women's sport in France at the time. She was French champion of female cross country running in 1928, and was selected to run the 800 metres at the 1928 Olympic Games in Amsterdam, continuing to compete until 1932.

Médaille de la Résistance 
On the 7th July 1940, Sébastienne Guyot learnt that her younger brother René had become a prisoner of war earlier that month. He was held at the Mulsanne camp and Sebastienne decided to try to rescue him, leaving Toulouse on 9 July.

She somehow crossed the German army's lines without discovery, arriving at Mulsanne on 15 July and managed to get in touch with her brother. René explained that he had been appointed the “commandant du camp” the representative of all the other prisoners in dealing with the Wehrmacht, and felt that he could not abandon his men as his escape could endanger them. Sébastienne had to agree with the logic of his argument and left to return to Toulouse. She was discovered by German troops and found to be in possession of a map with instructions for evading them as well as a compass (her family think she travelled in her Renault car). She was arrested on 19 July 1940, tried in a court martial on 5 August and sentenced to six months in jail.

Despite the prison staff being French and visits from a chaplain, Guyot fell ill in prison and did not receive proper treatment. When her brother George arrived to pick her up at the end of her sentence in January 1941, he learned that she had just been hospitalised as an emergency. He discovered her in a skeletal state in the hospital, with gangrenous frostbitten hands. George rushed her to Paris where a surgeon saved her hand, but the disease progressed and she died in great pain at the Broussais Hospital on 22 August 1941.

She received the Médaille de la Résistance posthumously in March 1947. Her three brothers survived the war.

Legacy  
Guyot was awarded the medal of the resistance posthumously.

She is the only woman whose name is on the war memorial  of the Ecole Centrale.

Since 2010, a scholarship in her name has been given annually to five young Ecole Centrale students to fully fund their studies at the School.

In 2015, a street was named after Sébastienne Guyot, one of the eight streets in the new university area of Moulon in Gif-sur-Yvette, which will accommodate CentraleSupélec in 2017, following the merger of Centrale Paris and Supélec.

References  

20th-century women engineers
20th-century French engineers
French women engineers
Aeronautical engineers
École Centrale Paris alumni
French female middle-distance runners
Athletes (track and field) at the 1928 Summer Olympics
Olympic athletes of France
Sportspeople from Finistère
People from Pont-l'Abbé
20th-century French women
French civilians killed in World War II
1896 births
1941 deaths